Park Jong-geun (politician)
 Park Jong-geun (labor activist)